PS I Love You are a Canadian indie rock duo based in Kingston, Ontario, consisting of Paul Saulnier on vocals/guitar/bass pedals and Benjamin Nelson on drums. The band is signed to Canadian independent record label Paper Bag Records. The band is known for its forceful themes, guitar effects, and loud percussion.

History
PS I Love You, a play on lead-singer and guitarist Paul Saulnier's initials, formed in Kingston, Ontario in 2006 as a solo project. Drummer Benjamin Nelson joined in 2008. Saulnier and Nelson had previously worked together in another Kingston band, Magic Jordan. The band gained notoriety as a result of a split 7-inch with artist Diamond Rings, which led to both groups gaining favourable reviews.

The band's debut album, Meet Me at the Muster Station, was released in October, 2010 to favourable reviews from Pitchfork Media, who praised the track "Facelove" as "Best New Music"., and also from Exclaim! Magazine, which included it on its list of Top Pop & Rock Albums of 2010. Meet Me at the Muster Station appeared on the !Earshot National Top 50 Chart, and was longlisted for the 2011 Polaris Music Prize.

Their second album, Death Dreams, was released on May 8, 2012, on Paper Bag Records. The record was also included on the Polaris Prize Long List.

The band released their third studio album, For Those Who Stay, on July 22, 2014, on Paperbag Records.

Band members
Members
 Paul Saulnier – lead vocals, guitar, bass, bass pedals
 Benjamin Nelson – drums, percussion, backing vocals

Touring members
 Tim Bruton – bass, rhythm guitars, keyboards, backing vocals (2011–present)

Discography

Studio albums

Live albums

Extended plays

References

External links

 A scary Q&A with Paul Saulnier re. "Death Dreams" (via Talk Rock To Me) May 30, 2012
 Inescapable...in a good way: A feature interview with Paul Saulnier (via Talk Rock To Me) July 29, 2011

Musical groups established in 2006
Musical groups from Kingston, Ontario
Canadian indie rock groups
Canadian garage rock groups
Paper Bag Records artists
2006 establishments in Ontario
Rocket Girl artists